The 2021 Grote Prijs Jean-Pierre Monseré was the 9th edition of the Grote Prijs Jean-Pierre Monseré road cycling one-day race in Belgium. It was a 1.1-rated event on the 2021 UCI Europe Tour. The race was won by Belgian cyclist Tim Merlier of the  team.

Teams
Five UCI WorldTeams, eight UCI ProTeams, and twelve UCI Continental teams made up the twenty-five teams that participated in the race. 145 of 168 riders finished the race.

UCI WorldTeams

 
 
 
 
 

UCI ProTeams

 
 
 
 
 
 
 
 

UCI Continental Teams

Result

References

Grote Prijs Jean-Pierre Monseré
Grote Prijs Jean-Pierre Monseré
Grote Prijs Jean-Pierre Monseré